Nils-Per Skarseth (born 1 April 1945) is a Norwegian former ski jumper. He was born in Oslo, and represented the club Lørenskog Skiklubb. He competed at the 1972 Winter Olympics in Sapporo. He was Norwegian champion in large hill in 1973.

References

External links

1945 births
Living people
Skiers from Oslo
Norwegian male ski jumpers
Olympic ski jumpers of Norway
Ski jumpers at the 1972 Winter Olympics